Jhansla is a village in Punjab, India, near     Banur.

The Chitkara Institute of Engineering and Technology, the Swami Vivekanand Institute of Engineering and Technology, and the Gian Sagar Institute for Medical Studies are all in Jhansla.

References

Cities and towns in Patiala district